Iryna Vasylivna Buy (born 29 April 1995) is a Ukrainian Paralympic biathlete and cross-country skier. She won the gold medal in the women's 10 kilometres standing event at the 2022 Winter Paralympics held in Beijing, China. She also competed at the Winter Paralympics in 2014 and 2018.

Early life
Buy was born on 29 April 1995 in Derazhnia, Khmelnytskyi Oblast. She was born with congenital malformation of the left hand.

Career
At the age of 15, Buy started playing sports. She made her debut on the international arena in December 2011, taking part in international competitions in cross-country skiing and biathlon. In 2012, Buy was included in the Paralympic team of Ukraine.

At the 2012 World Cup in Vuokatti, Finland in the 12.5 km biathlon event, Buy won a bronze medal. At the 2013 World Championships in Sollefteå, Sweden, she also won gold and silver in 10 km and 12.5 km events respectively. Buy became the winner of the finals of the World Cup in 2013.

At the 2021 World Para Snow Sports Championships in biathlon, Buy won the silver medal in the women's 10km standing biathlon event. She also won the gold medal in the women's 12.5km standing biathlon event.

She won the gold medal in the women's 10 kilometres standing event at the 2022 Winter Paralympics held in Beijing, China. The silver and bronze medals were also won by Ukrainian competitors.

References

External links
 

1995 births
Living people
Ukrainian female biathletes
Ukrainian female cross-country skiers
Paralympic cross-country skiers of Ukraine
Paralympic biathletes of Ukraine
Cross-country skiers at the 2014 Winter Paralympics
Cross-country skiers at the 2022 Winter Paralympics
Biathletes at the 2014 Winter Paralympics
Biathletes at the 2018 Winter Paralympics
Biathletes at the 2022 Winter Paralympics
Medalists at the 2022 Winter Paralympics
Paralympic medalists in biathlon
Paralympic medalists in cross-country skiing
Paralympic gold medalists for Ukraine
Paralympic bronze medalists for Ukraine
Sportspeople from Khmelnytskyi Oblast
21st-century Ukrainian women